El Triunfo Canton is a canton of Ecuador, located in the Guayas Province.  Its capital is the town of El Triunfo.  Its population at the 2001 census was 34,117.

Demographics
Ethnic groups as of the Ecuadorian census of 2010:
Mestizo  75.2%
Afro-Ecuadorian  10.0%
White  7.1%
Montubio  6.6%
Indigenous  0.8%
Other  0.3%

References

Cantons of Guayas Province